Marcel Seegert (born 29 April 1994) is a German professional footballer who plays as a centre-back for  club Waldhof Mannheim.

References

External links
 
 

1994 births
Living people
Footballers from Mannheim
German footballers
Germany youth international footballers
Association football defenders
1. FSV Mainz 05 II players
SV Waldhof Mannheim players
SV Sandhausen players
2. Bundesliga players
3. Liga players
Regionalliga players